Seele mit Herz ("Soul with Heart") is the debut solo album by German singer Cassandra Steen. It was released by 3p on 4 August 2003 in German-speaking Europe. Recorded within a hiatus of her former group Glashaus, Steen worked with producers JC-Mjusix, Nachtwandler, Nene, and Thomas Ruffner on the bulk of the album that combined rhythm and blues with soul pop music. Label mates Moses Pelham and Illmatic as well as rappers Eko Fresh, Azad and Kool Savas appear as guest vocalist on the album.

Track listing

Charts

Weekly charts

Release history

References

External links
 CassandraSteen.de — official website

2003 debut albums
Cassandra Steen albums
German-language albums